"This Time Around" is a song written and performed by American pop rock band Hanson. It was the title track and second single from the band's second studio album, This Time Around (2000). American singer Jonny Lang plays an electric guitar on the song. It was released as a commercial single in the United States and Canada on April 4, 2000.

The song peaked at number 20 on the US Billboard Hot 100, number 13 on the Canadian RPM 100 Hit Tracks chart, and number one on the Canadian Singles Chart, but it did not obtain any significant success elsewhere except Australia, where it peaked at number 42 on the ARIA Singles Chart in July 2000. A music video directed by David Meyers was made for the song.

Track listings
All songs were written by Isaac Hanson, Taylor Hanson, and Zachary Hanson.

US CD and cassette single
 "This Time Around" – 4:17
 "Love Song" – 4:06

Australian CD1
 "This Time Around" (radio edit)
 "This Time Around" (remix)
 "Lonely Again"
 "If Only" (Bitten by the Black Dog)
 "This Time Around" (enhanced video)

Australian CD2
 "This Time Around" (radio edit)
 "If Only" (JFP club mix)
 "If Only" (JFP dub mix)
 "If Only" (live on The Panel, March 2000)
 "Look at You" (live from Albertane)

European CD single
 "This Time Around" (radio edit) – 3:55
 "This Time Around" (remix) – 3:45

Personnel
Personnel are adapted from the Australian CD1 liner notes.
 Hanson – production, vocal production
 Isaac Hanson – vocals, electric and acoustic guitar, writing
 Taylor Hanson – vocals, piano, organ, percussion, harmonica, writing
 Zachary Hanson – vocals, drums, writing
 Jonny Lang – electric guitar
 Stephen Lironi – production
 Mark Hudson – vocal production
 Tom Lord-Alge – mixing

Charts

Release history

References

2000 singles
2000 songs
Canadian Singles Chart number-one singles
Hanson (band) songs
Island Records singles
Music videos directed by Dave Meyers (director)
Songs written by Isaac Hanson
Songs written by Taylor Hanson
Songs written by Zac Hanson